Thomas Hugh Serviss (born May 25, 1948) is a retired professional ice hockey player who played 286 games in the World Hockey Association.  He played for the Los Angeles Sharks, Michigan Stags, Baltimore Blades, Quebec Nordiques, and Calgary Cowboys.

References 

1948 births
Baltimore Blades players
Canadian ice hockey right wingers
Calgary Cowboys players
Greensboro Generals (EHL) players
Greensboro Generals (SHL) players
Living people
Los Angeles Sharks players
Michigan Stags players
Quebec Nordiques (WHA) players
Tidewater Sharks players